Bansulab-e Shir Mohammad (also Romanized as Bānsūlāb-e Shīr Moḩammad; also known as Malek ‘Alī Veysī) is a village in Qalkhani Rural District, Gahvareh District, Dalahu County, Kermanshah Province, Iran. At the 2006 census, its population was 87, in 23 families.

References 

Populated places in Dalahu County